Get a Little Closer may refer to

Albums
Get a Little Closer, by Ricky Lynn Gregg, or the title song (1994)

Songs
"Get a Little Closer", by Joe from Everything (1993)
"Get a Little Closer", by Fair Warning from Rainmaker (1995)
"Get a Little Closer", by Nazia and Zoheb (1982)
"Get a Little Closer", by M. Pokora from Mise à jour (2010)
"Get a Little Closer", by Pretty Ricky from Bluestars (2005)